4',7-Dihydroxy-6-methoxyflavone is a bioactive O-methylated flavone, a type of flavonoid. It is the 6-O-methylated derivative of 6,7,4'-Trihydroxyflavone, isolated from Iva hayesiana and from Mentha suaveolens.

References 

O-methylated flavones